177 (one hundred [and] seventy-seven) is the natural number following 176 and preceding 178.

In mathematics
It is a Leyland number since . 

It is a 60-gonal number, and an arithmetic number, since the mean of its divisors (1, 3, 59 and 177) is equal to 60, an integer.

177 is a Leonardo number, part of a sequence of numbers closely related to the Fibonacci numbers. In graph enumeration, there are 177 undirected graphs (not necessarily connected) that have seven edges and no isolated vertices, and 177 rooted trees with ten nodes and height at most three. There are 177 ways of re-connecting the (labeled) vertices of a regular octagon into a star polygon that does not use any of the octagon edges.

In other fields
177 is the second highest score for a flight of three darts, below the highest score of 180.

See also
 The year AD 177 or 177 BC
 List of highways numbered 177

References 

Integers